Gwen Charles (born July 19, 1949 in Lindsay, Ontario) is a politician in Manitoba, Canada.  She was a member of the Legislative Assembly of Manitoba from 1988 to 1990, representing the riding of Selkirk for the Manitoba Liberal Party.

The daughter of Allen Glover, she grew up in Belleville Ontario and began her career at the municipal level, serving as a councillor in the town of Selkirk. She married Garry James Gordon Charles in 1969.  Charles first ran for provincial office in the election of 1986, finishing third in the Selkirk riding with 1023 votes. At the time, the riding's MLA was New Democrat Howard Pawley, the provincial Premier.

In early 1988, Pawley's government was unexpectedly defeated when disgruntled backbencher Jim Walding voted against his party's annual budget in an evenly divided legislature.  Pawley stepped down as premier and did not run in the election which followed.  With the riding open, Charles was able to defeat NDP candidate Terry Sargeant by just 184 votes.

The Liberals increased their parliamentary representation from one to twenty in this election, and Charles spent the next two years in the official opposition.  In 1990, she supported Paul Martin for the leadership of the Liberal Party of Canada.

Like many of her Liberal colleagues, she was defeated in the 1990 election amid a general decline in support for her party (once again, she placed third behind the NDP and Progressive Conservative candidates).

Gwen moved back to Ontario and built one of the first social enterprises, Pivotal Services of London, winning the Peter F. Drucker Award for Innovation.

Elections

References

Manitoba Liberal Party MLAs
1949 births
Living people
Women MLAs in Manitoba